Crossed Wires is a 1923 American comedy film directed by King Baggot and written by Hugh Hoffman. The film stars Gladys Walton, George Stewart, Tom Guise, Lillian Langdon, William Robert Daly, and Kate Price. The film was released on May 14, 1923, by Universal Pictures.

Cast          
Gladys Walton as Marcel Murphy
George Stewart as Ralph Benson
Tom Guise as Bellamy Benson 
Lillian Langdon as Mrs. Margaret Benson
William Robert Daly as Pat Murphy
Kate Price as Nora Murphy
Eddie Gribbon as Tim Flanagan
Marie Crisp as Madalyn Van Ralston Kemp
Eloise Nesbit as Annie
Helen Broneau as Fannie
Lewis Mason as Cyril Gordon

References

External links

1923 films
1920s English-language films
Silent American comedy films
1923 comedy films
Universal Pictures films
Films directed by King Baggot
American silent feature films
American black-and-white films
1920s American films